Vračev Gaj is a village in Serbia. It is situated in the Bela Crkva municipality, in the South Banat District, Vojvodina province. The village has a Serb ethnic majority (94.57%) and a population of 1,568 (2002 census).

Name

In Serbian, the village is known as Vračev Gaj (Врачев Гај), in Hungarian as Varázsliget, and in Croatian as Vračev Gaj.

Historical population

1961: 2,250
1971: 2,145
1981: 2,040
1991: 1,870
2002: 1,568

See also
Bela Crkva lakes
List of places in Serbia
List of cities, towns and villages in Vojvodina

References
Slobodan Ćurčić, Broj stanovnika Vojvodine, Novi Sad, 1996.

External links
Vračev Gaj

Populated places in Serbian Banat
Populated places in South Banat District
Bela Crkva